Wiesław Witold Gawlikowski (born 2 July 1951) is a Polish sport shooter. He was born in Kraków. He won a bronze medal in skeet at the 1976 Summer Olympics in Montreal.

References

1951 births
Living people
Sportspeople from Kraków
Polish male sport shooters
Olympic shooters of Poland
Olympic bronze medalists for Poland
Shooters at the 1968 Summer Olympics
Shooters at the 1972 Summer Olympics
Shooters at the 1976 Summer Olympics
Shooters at the 1980 Summer Olympics
Medalists at the 1976 Summer Olympics
Olympic medalists in shooting
20th-century Polish people